1-Tetracosanol (lignoceryl alcohol) is a fatty alcohol containing 24 carbon atoms, usually derived from the fatty acid lignoceric acid.

References

Fatty alcohols
Primary alcohols
Alkanols